Cedars was the second album released by Clearlake, in 2003, two years after their debut release, Lido. It includes the single "Almost the Same", and both tracks from the double A-side "The Mind Is Evil"/"Come Into the Darkness".  The album also includes a secret hidden track. It is located in the pregap before the first track on the CD.

Track listing

Personnel
 Irvin Baker – Mixing
 James Butcher – Percussion, Drums, Group Member
 Clearlake – Engineer
 Matthew Cooper – Layout Design, Collage
 Jason Evans – Photography
 Giles Hall – Engineer, Mixing
 Sam Hewitt – Guitar, Keyboards, Vocals, Group Member
 Sean Magee – Mastering
 Tobias May – Engineer
 Jason Pegg – Guitar, Keyboards, Vocals, Producer, String Arrangements, Group Member
 Simon Pegg – Lighting, Pyrotechnics
 Simon Raymonde – Producer, Mixing
 David Woodward – Bass, Guitar, Vocals, Group Member

References

2003 albums
Clearlake (band) albums
Domino Recording Company albums